Not to be mistaken for Andrzej Tadeusz Kijowski, his son.

Andrzej Kijowski (29 November 1928, Krakow, Poland – 29 June 1985, Warsaw, Poland) was  a Polish literary critic, essayist, prose and screenwriter. His son is poet and critic Andrzej Tadeusz Kijowski.

Kijowski, Sr. wrote for such publications as Przegląd Kulturalny and Tygodnik Powszechny. He was editor for many years of Twórczość, where the well-known Kroniki Dedala (Daedalus Chronicles) was published.

He authored the Polish writers' resolution against censorship after the play Dziady (Ghost) by Adam Mickiewicz was withdrawn from the stage on 29 February 1968. A literary director at Warsaw’s Dramatic Theatre from 1967 to 1968, he was removed by the Communist authorities. He was one of the organizers of the Polish Flying University.

Director at Juliusz Słowacki Theatre in Krakow from 1981 until he resigned in February 1982 after being released from Jaworze, where he had been interned for reasons connected to Martial law in Poland.

Legacy
The Andrzej Kijowski Award for literary achievements was set up in 1985.

Literary work
Wrote stories:
Oskarżony (The Accused)
Pseudonimy (Pseudonyms)
Szyfry (The Codes)
Dyrygent (The Orchestra Conductor)
Wrote critical essays:
Miniatury krytyczne (Critical Miniatures)
Szósta Dekada (The Sixties)
Listopadowy wieczór (November Evening)
Wrote screenplays:
Szyfry (The Codes)
Wesele (The Wedding)
Dyrygent (The Orchestra Conductor)
Z Dalekiego Kraju (From a Far Country)

External links
Andrzej Kijowski website

1928 births
1985 deaths
Polish essayists
Male essayists
Polish political writers
Polish democracy activists
Polish dissidents
International Writing Program alumni
20th-century essayists
20th-century Polish screenwriters
Male screenwriters
20th-century Polish male writers